Aprendiendo a amar (English title: Learning to Love) is a Mexican telenovela produced by Ernesto Alonso for Televisa in 1980.

Cast 
Susana Alexander as Cristina
Ernesto Alonso as César
Lupita D'Alessio as Jimena
Susana Dosamantes as Teresa
Columba Domínguez as Carmelita
Celia Manzano as Lupe
Miguel Manzano as Mario
Carlos Bracho as Alfredo
Tony Bravo as Adrian
Raymundo Capetillo as Hugo
Mercedes Pascual as Amanda
Erika Buenfil as Natalia
Héctor Sáez as Ricardo
Fabio Ramírez as Walter Simpson
Flor Trujillo as Susy del Rio
Ricardo Marti as Alejandro
Francisco Avendaño
Toni Saldana
Miguel Macia as Pedro

References

External links 

Mexican telenovelas
Televisa telenovelas
Spanish-language telenovelas
1980 telenovelas
1980 Mexican television series debuts
1980 Mexican television series endings